Raysal is a census-designated place (CDP) in McDowell County, West Virginia, United States. Raysal has a post office with ZIP code 24879. As of the 2010 census, its population was 465.

The community's name is an amalgamation of Raymond Salvati, a mining official.

Raysal is on the Norfolk Southern Railway(former Norfolk and Western) network.

References

Census-designated places in McDowell County, West Virginia
Census-designated places in West Virginia